Danièle Tremblay-Lamer (born November 2, 1946) is a former judge of the Federal Court of Canada.

Tremblay-Lamer was born in Quebec to Laurette and Marcellin Tremblay. She graduated from College de Français in Montreal, Laval University and University of Ottawa. She was called to the Quebec bar in 1982.

Tremblay-Lamer was married to former Chief Justice the late Antonio Lamer from 1987 until his death in 2007.

References

1946 births
Living people
Canadian women judges
Judges of the Federal Court of Canada
People from Quebec City